Heroes of the Cross is a 1909 production by the Limelight Department of The Salvation Army in Australia.

Many items from the production were later mistaken as coming from the 1900 film, Soldiers of the Cross.

References

External links

Heroes of the Cross items at National Film and Sound Archive

Australian silent films
1909 films
Australian black-and-white films
Limelight Department films